Csombárd is a village in Somogy county, Hungary.

External links 
  Street map

References 

Populated places in Somogy County